Tuczno  is a village in the administrative district of Gmina Pobiedziska, within Poznań County, Greater Poland Voivodeship, in west-central Poland.

In 2004 the village had a population of 130. It lies on the southern edge of the Puszcza Zielonka forest and landscape park. It is close to a series of lakes, and contains a large complex of vacation properties.

References

Tuczno